Desmond Egan (born 15 July 1936 in Athlone, County Westmeath) is an Irish poet. He has published 24 Collections of poetry and published translations of Sophocles' Philoctetes and Euripides' Medea. His own work has been translated into Albanian, Bulgarian, Croatian, Czech, Dutch, French, German, Greek, Hungarian, Italian, Japanese, Polish, Swedish, Chinese, Spanish, Slovenian and Russian. He founded The Goldsmith Press (1972), edited the quarterly magazine for the arts Era (1974-1984), and starting in 1987 he has served as artistic director of the Gerard Manley Hopkins International Festival each July in Kildare, Ireland.

Life
Egan was born in Athlone in the Irish midlands.  His parents were Thomas Egan, businessman and National School teacher Kathleen Garland.  He attended St Finian's College in Mullingar, then University at St Patrick's College, Maynooth (now Maynooth University), where he obtained his BA (1962), and University College Dublin, where he obtained his MA (1965).  He returned to his old school St Finian’s (1965-1971) to teach Greek, then taught English at Newbridge College, County Kildare. He settled in Newbridge and gave up teaching in 1987 to focus on writing as a career.  He is married to the writer Vivienne Abbot. They have two daughters, Kate and Bebhin. Egan is fluent in Irish and speaks/reads French, German and Spanish. Also proficient in Classical Greek.

Collections
 1972. Midland, Newbridge, Ireland: The Goldsmith Press. With drawings by Brian Bourke
 1972. Poiemata, Readings in Poetry and Prose for Young People, chosen by Egan, Rice. Dublin: Fallons 
 1973 Choice, An anthology of Irish poetry selected by the poets themselves. Edited by Desmond Egan and Michael Hartnett, Newbridge, Ireland: The Goldsmith Press
 1974 Leaves, Newbridge, Ireland: The Goldsmith Press.  With drawings by Charles Cullen
 1976 Siege, Newbridge, Ireland: The Goldsmith Press
 1978 Woodcutter, Newbridge, Ireland: The Goldsmith Press. Illustrations by Alberto Giacometti
 1980 Athlone?, Newbridge, Ireland: The Goldsmith Press.  With photographs by Fergus Bourke
 1983 Seeing Double,  Newbridge, Ireland: The Goldsmith Press.  With illustrations by Alex Sadkowsky
 1983 Collected Poems,  Orono, Maine, NPF. Winner of The National Poetry Foundation of USA Award
 1989 A Song for my Father, Newbridge, Ireland: The Kavanagh Press
 1990 The Death of Metaphor, essays, Gerrard's Cross, England: Colin Smythe
 1991 Medea, translation of Euripides. St. Andrew's Press, Laurinburg, USA  
 1992 Peninsula, Poems of the Dingle Peninsula. Newbridge, Ireland: The Kavanagh Press. With Photographs by Liam Lyons 
 1992 Snapdragon,  Little Rock, Arkansas: Milestone Press
 1992 Selected Poems, Omaha, Nebraska: Creighton University Press. Selected and with Introduction by Hugh Kenner
 1994 Poems for Eimear, Limited Edition. Little Rock, Arkansas. Milestone Press 
 1994 In the Holocaust of Autumn A sequence in nine parts; Foreword by Ben Briscoe. Newbridge, Ireland: The Goldsmith Press
 1995 Elegies, Newbridge, Ireland: The Goldsmith Press 
 1997 Famine, Newbridge, Ireland: The Goldsmith Press. With drawings by James McKenna
 1998 Philoctetes, translation of Sophocles. Little Rock, Arkansas: Milestone Press, USA
 1999 Prelude: A Sequence of Poems for Hans Pålsson, Pianist. Limited ed., Newbridge, Ireland: The Goldsmith Press 
 2000 Music, Newbridge, Ireland: The Goldsmith Press
 2001 The Hill of Allen, Newbridge, Ireland: The Goldsmith Press. With drawings by James McKenna
 2005 The Outdoor Light, Newbridge, Ireland: The Goldsmith Press
 2009 The Bronze Horseman, Essays, Newbridge, Ireland: The Goldsmith Press
 2012 Hopkins in Kildare, Newbridge, Ireland: The Goldsmith Press
 2015 Epic, Newbridge, Ireland: The Goldsmith Press
 2017 Hopeful Hopkins, Essays, Newbridge, Ireland: The Goldsmith Press

Anthologies
 Eva Hesse, Lyrik Importe, ein Lesebuch, Aachen: Rimbuad, 2004
 Hunderose: Neue Irische Gedichte, Augsburg: Maroverlag, 1983
 Wenzell (ed.), Woven Shades of Green: Irish Nature Literature, Lewisburg: Bucknell Press, 2019
 Koesu / Sekine (eds.), Irish Writers and Politics, Gerrads Cross: Colin Smythe, 1989
 Gunnar Harding, Bengt Jangfeldt (eds.), Artes, 3, Stockholm,1997
 Robert Welch (ed.) Irish Writers and Religion, Maryland: Barnes & Noble, 1992
 J-Y Masson (ed.), Anthologie de la Poesie irlandaise du XXe siecle, Paris: Verdier, 1996
 ThomasFoster Elizabeth Guthrioen(eds.), A Year in Poetry, New York: Crown Publishers, 1995
 Juri Talvet (ed.) Valitud tolkeluulet Anthology II (1970-2020), Tartu: Ulikool, 2022

DVDs / CDs
 CD: Needing the Sea, Goldsmith Press, Newbridge, Co. Kildare, 1995. John Hunter/Jim Kelly, Directors
 DVD: Desmond Egan; Through the Eyes of a Poet, Washburn University and KTWU, Kansas

Books in translation
French
 Terre et Paix 1989 tr. Patrick Rafroidi, Daniel Jacquin et al.
 Holocauste d’Autumne 1998 tr. Jean Poncet
 Peninsula 1996 tr.Jean Paul Blot
 Elegies 2000 Bruno Gaurier
 Music et Autres Poemes 2005 tr. Jean Paul Blot (Prix du livres Insulaires, 2005)
 Athlone 2015 tr. Bruno Gaurier
 Famine 2018 tr. Bruno Gaurier
Irish
 Mo Rogha  tr. Michael Hartnett, edited by Diarmuid Johnson, 2022
German
 Meine Geschichte der Irischen Dichtung/ My Irish Poems 1995 tr. S.Kohl; M. Pfister et al.
 Gedichte/ Poems 1999 tr. U. Borgmann/ S. Kohl
Dutch
 Echobogen/ Echo Arches 1990 tr. P Nijmeijer
Russian
 Selected Poems 1999 tr. Alla Savtchenko, Maria Popova
 Poems 2000 tr. Alla Savtchenko
Italian
 Quel Sole Storno Che Gelido Passa 1992  translator Giuseppe Serpillo
 Poesie Scelte/ Selected Poems 1994 tr. Francesco Marroni
 Carestia/ Famine 2000 tr. Donatella Abbate Badin
 Un Poeta di Irlanda 1990 tr. Enzo Bonventre
Spanish
 De Hambruna/ Famine 2002 tr. Marcus Hormiga
Czech
 Smiluj nad Basnikem/ Have Mercy on the Poet 1992 tr. Ivana Bozdechová
 DESpectrum (CD included) Poems and appreciations 2002 /2007 tr. Ivana Bozdechová
Chinese
 September Dandelion 2008 tr. Jin Wenning
Polish
 Poezje Wybrane/ Selected Poems 2002 tr. Aleksandra Kedzierska
Japanese
 Paper Cranes 1995 tr. Akira Yasukawa et al.
Greek
 Poiemata/ Poems 2001 tr. Georgia Ghinis
 Selected Poems  forthcoming tr. Giorgos Christoulides
Greek Cypriot
 Choice, translated by Despina Pirketti 2022
Croatian
 Christ in Connaught Street 2009 tr. Emil Cic
 Elegies 2018 tr. Nikola Duretic
Hungarian
 Selected Poems 2000 tr. Tomas Kabdebo
Bulgarian
 Selected Poems 1999 tr. D. Paryeba
Slovenian
 Too Little Peace/ Selected Poems 2007 tr. Robert Simonisek
Swedish
 How Lonely the Soul  tr. Lena Koster 2019
 Selected Poems  tr. Lena Koster forthcoming 2022
Romanian
 Black Windows, Selected Poems  tr. Emilia Ivancu  forthcoming 2022

Editor
 Poiemata Poetry and Prose for Young People 1972
 Focus (with Eoghan O Tuairisc) 1972
 Choice An Anthology of Modern Irish Poetry with Michael Hartnett 1973
 The Deserted Village edited, with Introduction 1974, reprinted 1977
 Brian Bourke: Marcel Marceau Drawings Introduction 1978
 Brian Bourke: a Catalogue of his Work, editor 1982
 Lost in the Woods Introduction,1992
 James McKenna; A Celebration ed. with Introduction 2007
 James McKenna The Complete Catalogue ed. with Introduction 2008

Review editor
 Era Magazine 1,2,3,4,5,6,7 1975 to 1978

Poster poems
 Requiem Illustrated by Charles Cullen
 Listening to John McCormack Illustrated by Charles Cullen
 Needing the Sea Illustrated by Alex Sadkowski
 Brother Sister Chile Illustrated by Kathy Owens
 For Benjamin Moloise Illustrated by James McKenna
 First Communion
 For Rudy Romano Illustrated by Henry Flanagan
 Understanding God Too Quickly In Topeka Illustrated by John Hunter
 For Bill Langdon Illustrated by Wilhelm Fockersperger
 Freedom Illustrated by Wilhelm Fockersperger
 Newbridge College
 Peace illustrated by Brian Bourke
 Forget Me Not
 Requiem illus. by James McKenna 2018

Awards
 1983: Stanford Poetry Award 1983
 1983: National Poetry Foundation of USA Award for Collected Poems
 1987: Chicago Haymarket Literary Award
 1989: The Farrell Prize, New York
 1996: Honorary D.Litt. from Washburn University, Kansas, USA
 1998: Bologna Literary Award, Italy
 2001: Premio Anfiosso Literary Award (Italy)
 2004: Macedonia Literature Award
 2005: Ouessant (France) International Literary Award
 2010: Arpino (Italy): Il Libro di Pietra plaque
 2012: Newbridge Town Culture Award
 2015: Kildare County Council Literature Award
 2015: IBAM, Irish Books and Media (Chicago) Award for Literature

Offices held
 Founder and Artistic Director, The Gerard Manley Hopkins International Festival, Newbridge College: 1987 to present
 Juror The Neustadt International Literature Award University of Oklahoma 1999
 Cultural Relations Committee, Dept. of Foreign Affairs 2000 - 2003; 2003 - 2006
 Hon. President, The Classical Society of Ireland, 2004

Further reading
 Arkins, Brian, Desmond Egan: A Critical Study Milestone Press, Little Rock, USA, 1992.
 Kenner, Hugh, ed., Desmond Egan: The Poet and His Work. Northern Lights, Maine, USA,1990.
 Kunio Shimane,The Language of Now: Three Poems of Desmond Egan Studies: An Irish Quarterly Review, Vol. 91, No. 364 (Winter, 2002), pp. 390–398.
 Interview with Anthony Roche: Irish Literary Supplement, Volume 8, Number 2, 1 September 1989.
 The Oxford Companion to Irish Literature, Oxford, 1996
 The Influential Irish, Dublin, 2006
 The Gill Encyclopaedia of Ireland
 Modern Irish Writers: a Biography
 Modern Irish Lives
 Dictionary of Irish Literature
 Who’s Who in Ireland
 Adamson, William, Epic, Studies,2019

Conference lecturer/reader
USA
 Ezra Pound Conferences
 TS Eliot Conference; 
 Patrick Kavanagh Conference
 American Conferences on Irish Studies
 I.A.S.I.L. Conference etc.
Italy
Sardinia
France
UK
Germany
Spain
Macedonia
Belgium
Croatia
Nicaragua
Austria
South Korea 
China
Japan
Sweden
Ireland: W.B. Yeats Conference First Creative Writing Director
	Patrick Kavanagh Weekend
	UCD First Poet in Residence; Lecture series
	Galway Classical Conference
	John Broderick Weekend, Athlone
	Ireland Classical Society Presidential Lecture
	NUI Maynooth French and English Groups; IASIL Conference
	The Hopkins Festival
	Michael Hartnett Weekend, Dublin
	Gerard Manley Hopkins Festivals

Selected articles
 The Book of Kells   Art and Antiques USA c.1990
 Peter Connolly   The Furrow
 The Dominicans of Galway  Yearbook, 1991
 Patrick Kavanagh  in P.K. Man and Poet USA 1991
 Happy Hopkins   Studies, winter 2012
 Art and Illness   2nd World Humanities Forum Proceedings 2012
 Gabriel Marcel   Kansas Journal 2019

Essays / reviews
 Various Countries incl. USA, UK, France, Germany, Ireland

Portraits
 Brian Bourke 1972
 Brian Bourke Triptique 1988
 Charles Cullen 1974
 Alex Sadkowsky 1982
 Wilhelm Fockersperger c.10 times
 Chinese Artist 1990
 James McKenna 1998

References

External Links
 Desmond Egan reads his poem "Peace" video
 List of works by Desmond Egan
 Mediterránean Poetry: 
 Literature Ireland: 

20th-century Irish poets
1936 births
Living people
People from Athlone
People educated at St Finian's College
Alumni of St Patrick's College, Maynooth